William Spridlington  was  Dean of St Asaph from 1357 until 1376; and then Bishop of St Asaph from  1376 until his death on 9 April 1382.

References 

14th-century Welsh Roman Catholic priests
Deans of St Asaph
1382 deaths
Bishops of St Asaph